The Cagots were a persecuted minority found in the west of France and northern Spain: the Navarrese Pyrenees, Basque provinces, Béarn, Aragón, Gascony and Brittany. Evidence of the group exists as far back as 1000 CE.

Name

Etymology 
It has been suggested that they were descendants of the Visigoths
defeated by Clovis I at the Battle of Vouillé,
Yet in opposition to this etymology is the fact that the word  is first found in this form no earlier than the year 1542.
Seventeenth century French historian Pierre de Marca, in his , propounds the reverse – that the word signifies "hunters of the Goths", and that the Cagots were descendants of the Saracens and Moors of Al-Andalus (or even Jews) after their defeat by Charles Martel,
although this proposal was comprehensively refuted by the Prior of Livorno, Abbot , as early as 1754.
Antoine Court de Gébelin derives the term cagot from the Latin ,  meaning "false, bad, deceitful", and  meaning "god", due to a belief that Cagots were descended from the Alans and followed Arianism.

Variations 
Their name differed by province and the local language: 
 In Gascony they were called ,  and 
 In Bordeaux they were called ,  or 
 In Agenais, Bordeaux, and Landes de Gascogne they were called 
 In Bigorre they were also called  or 
 In Aunis and Poitou they were also called /
 , or  referencing Gehazi the servant of Elisha who was cursed with leprosy due to his greed. With the  recording  as an insult regularly used against Cagots.  is seen in the writings of Dominique Joseph Garat. 

Previously some of these names had been viewed as being similar yet separate groups from the Cagots, though this changed in some cases in later research.

Geography 

The cagots were present in France in Gascony to the Basque Country, but also in the north of Spain (in Aragon, south and north Navarre, and Asturias) where they are referred to commonly by the term Agotes. 

Cagots were typically required to live in separate quarters,on the outskirts of towns. These hamlets were called  then from the 16th century , which were often on the far outskirts of the villages. On the scale of Béarn, for example, the distribution of cagots, often carpenters, was similar to that of other craftsmen, who were numerous mainly in the Piedmont. Far from congregating in a only a few places, the cagots were scattered in over 137 villages and towns. Outside the mountains, 35 to 40% of communities had cagots, especially the largest ones, excluding very small villages.

Toponomy 

Toponymy and topography indicate that the places where the cagots were found have constant characteristics; these are gaps, generally across rivers or outside town walls, called “” (and derivatives) or “” (Laplace names are frequent) next to water points, places allocated to live and above all to practice their trades.

Toponymy also provides evidence of areas where Cagots had lived in the past. Various Street names are still in use such as:
  in the municipalities of Montgaillard and Lourdes
  in Laurède
  in (Roquefort) 
  in Saint-Girons
  in the municipalities of Mézin, Sos, Vic-Fezensac, Aire-sur-l'Adour, Eauze, and Gondrin
  in Villeneuve-de-Marsan 
  in Vérines 

In Aubiet, there is a locality called “”. It was in this hamlet, that the cagots of Aubiet lived, on the left bank of the Arrats, separated from the village by the river. In this last example, the discovery of the name of the place allowed teachers to discover the local history of the cagots and to start educational work.

Treatment 

Cagots were shunned and hated; while restrictions varied by time and place, with many discriminatory actions being codified into law in France in 1460,  they were typically required to live in separate quarters. Cagots were excluded from various political and social rights.

Religion and government 
Cagots were not allowed to marry non-Cagots leading to forced endogamy, though in some areas in the later centuries (such as Béarn) they were able to marry non-Cagots though the non-Cagot would then be classed as a Cagot. They were not allowed to enter taverns or use public fountains. The marginalization of the Cagots began at baptism where chimes were not rung in celebration as was the case for non-Cagots and that the baptisms were held at nightfall. Within parish registries the term , or its scholarly synonym , was entered. Cagots were buried in cemeteries separate from non-Cagots with reports of riots occurring if bishops tried to have the bodies moved to non-Cagot cemeteries. Commonly Cagots were not given a standard last name in registries and records but were only listed by their first name, followed by the mention "" or "", such as on their baptismal certificate, They were allowed to enter a church only by a special door and, during the service, a rail separated them from the other worshippers. They were forbidden from joining the priesthood. Either they were altogether forbidden to partake of the sacrament, or the Eucharist was given to them on the end of a wooden spoon, while a holy water stoup was reserved for their exclusive use. They were compelled to wear a distinctive dress to which, in some places, was attached the foot of a goose or duck (whence they were sometimes called ), and latterly to have a red representation of a goose's foot in fabric sewn onto their clothes. Whilst in Navarre a court ruling in 1623 required all Cagots to wear cloaks with a yellow trim to identify them as Cagots.

Work 

Cagots were prohibited from selling food or wine, touching food in the market, working with livestock, or entering mills. The Cagots were often restricted to craft trades including those of carpenter, masons, woodcutters, wood carvers, coopers, butcher, and rope-maker. Due to association with woodworking crafts, Cagots often worked as the operators of instruments of torture and execution, as well as making the instruments themselves. Such professions may have perpetuated their social ostracisation. Cagot women were often midwives until the 15th century. Due to social exclusion, in France the Cagots were exempt from taxation until the 18th century. By the 19th century these restrictions seem to have been lifted, but the trades continued to be practiced by Cagots, along with other trades such as weaving and blacksmithing.

Because the main identifying mark of the Cagots was the restriction of their trades to a few small options, their segregation has been compared to the caste system in India.

Accusations and pseudo-medical beliefs 
The Cagots were not an ethnic nor a religious group. They spoke the same language as the people in an area and generally kept the same religion as well, with later researchers remarking that there was no evidence to mark the Cagots as distinct from their neighbours. Their only distinguishing feature was their descent from families long identified as Cagots. Few consistent reasons were given as to why they were hated; accusations varied from Cagots being cretins, lepers, heretics, cannibals, sorcerers, werewolves, sexual deviants, to actions they were accused of such as poisoning wells, or for simply being intrinsically evil.  also notes how it was also believed that they could cause children to fall ill by touching them or even just looking at them. So pestilential was their touch considered that it was a crime for them to walk the common road barefooted or to drink from the same cup as non-Cagots. It was also a common belief that the Cagots gave off a foul smell.  recorded that many believed Cagots were born with a tail.

The French early psychiatrist Jean-Étienne Dominique Esquirol wrote in his 1838 works that the Cagots were a subset of "idiot", and separate from "cretins". By the middle of the 19th century, previous pseudo-medical beliefs and beliefs of them being intellectually inferior had waned and German doctors, by 1849, regarded them as “not without the ability to become useful members of society.” Though various French and British doctors were continuing to label the Cagots as a race inherently afflicted with congenital disabilities to the end of the 19th century. Daniel Tuke wrote in 1880 after visiting communities where Cagots lived, noted how local people would not subject "cretins" born to non-Cagots to living with Cagots.

The Cagots did have a culture of their own, but very little of it was written down or preserved; as a result, almost everything that is known about them relates to their persecution. The repression lasted through the Middle Ages, Renaissance, and Industrial Revolution, with the prejudice fading only in the 19th and 20th centuries.

Origin

Biblical legends 
Various legends placed the Cagots as originating from biblical events, including being descendants of the carpenters who made the cross that Jesus was crucified on, or being descendants of the bricklayers who built Solomon's Temple after being expelled from ancient Israel by God due to poor craftsmanship. Similarly a more detailed legend places the origins of the Cagots in Spain as being descendants of a Pyrenean master carver named Jacques, who traveled to ancient Israel via Tartessos, to cast Boaz and Jachin for Solomon's Temple. While in Israel he was distracted during the casting of Jachin by a woman, and due to the imperfection this caused in the column his descendants were cursed to suffer leprosy.

Religious origin 
Another theory is that the Cagots were descendants of the Cathars, who had been persecuted for heresy in the Albigensian Crusade. With some comparisons including the use the term  to refer to Cagots, which evokes the name that the Cathars gave to themselves, . A delegation by Cagots to Pope Leo X in 1514 made this claim, though the Cagots predate the Cathar heresy and the Cathar heresy was not present in Gascony and other regions where Cagots were present. Perhaps this was a strategic move: in  statutes such stains of heresy expired after four generations and if this was the cause of their marginalisation, it also gave grounds for their emancipation. Others have suggested an origin as Arian Christians.

Thus, another theory is that the Cagots were early converts to Christianity, and that the hatred of their pagan neighbors continued after they also converted, merely for different reasons.

Medical origin 
Thus would arise the confusion between Christians and Cretins, and explain the similar restrictions placed on lepers and Cagots. Guy de Chauliac wrote in the 14th century, and Ambroise Paré wrote in 1561 of the Cagots being lepers with "beautiful faces" and skin with no signs of leprosy, describing them as "white lepers" (people afflicted with "white leprosy"). Later dermatologists believe that Paré was describing leucoderma. Early edicts apparently refer to lepers and Cagots as different categories of undesirables, With this distinction being explicit by 1593. The Parlement of Bordeaux repeated customary prohibitions against them but added when they are lepers, if there still are any, they must carry  (rattles). Later English commentators supported the idea of an origin among a community of lepers due to the similarities in the treatment of Cagots in churches and the measures taken to allow lepers in England and Scotland to attend churches.

Other origins 

 wrote that the Cagots were likely descendants of Spanish Roma from the Basque country.
 

The alleged physical appearance and ethnicity of the Cagots varied wildly from legends and stories; some local legends (especially those that held to the leper theory) indicated that Cagots had blonde hair and blue eyes, while those favoring the Arab descent story said that Cagots were considerably darker. In Pío Baroja's work  comments that Cagot residents of  had both individuals with "Germanic" features as well as individuals with "Romani" features. Though people who set out to research the Cagots found them to be a diverse class of people in physical appearance, as diverse as the non-Cagot communities around them. One common trend was to claim that Cagots had no ears or no earlobes, or that one ear was longer than the other, with other supposed identifiers including webbed hands and/or feet, or the presence of goitres.

Graham Robb finds most of the above theories unlikely:

A modern hypothesis of interest is that the Cagots are the descendants of a fallen medieval guild of carpenters. This theory would explain the most salient thing Cagots throughout France and Spain have in common: that is, being restricted in their choice of trade. The red webbed-foot symbol Cagots were sometimes forced to wear might have been the guild's original emblem.

There was a brief construction boom on the Way of St. James pilgrimage route in the 9th and 10th centuries; this could have brought the guild both power and suspicion. The collapse of their business would have left a scattered, yet cohesive group in the areas where Cagots are known.

For similar reasons due to their restricted trades, Delacampagne suggests a possible origin as a culturally distinct community of woodsmen who were Christianised relatively late.

Religion 

Cagots followed the same religion as the non-Cagots who lived around them. They were forced to use a side entrance to churches, often an intentionally low one to force Cagots to bow and remind them of their subservient status. This practice, done for cultural rather than religious reasons, did not change even between Catholic and Huguenot areas. They had their own holy water fonts set aside for Cagots, and touching the normal font was strictly forbidden. These restrictions were taken seriously; in the 18th century, a wealthy Cagot had his hand cut off and nailed to the church door for daring to touch the font reserved for "clean" citizens.

Cagots were expected to slip into churches quietly and congregate in the worst seats. Many Bretons believed that Cagots bled from their navel on Good Friday.

An appeal by the Cagots to Pope Leo X in 1514 was successful, and he published a papal bull in 1515, instructing that the Cagots be treated "with kindness, in the same way as the other believers." Still, little changed, as most local authorities ignored the bull.

Government 

The nominal though usually ineffective allies of the Cagots were the government, the educated, and the wealthy. This included Charles V who officially supported tolerance of and improvements to the lives of Cagots. It has been suggested that the odd patchwork of areas which recognized Cagots has more to do with which local governments tolerated the prejudice, and which allowed Cagots to be a normal part of society. In a study in 1683, doctors examined the Cagots and found them no different from normal citizens. Notably, they did not actually suffer from leprosy or any other disease that could clarify their exclusion from society. The Parliaments of Pau, Toulouse and Bordeaux were apprised of the situation, and money was allocated to improve the lot of the Cagots, but the populace and local authorities resisted.

In 1673, the Ursúa lords of the municipality of Baztán advocated the recognition of the local Cagots as natural residents of the Baztán. Also in the 17th century Jean-Baptiste Colbert officially freed Cagots in France from their servitude to parish churches and from restrictions placed upon them, though in practicality nothing changed.

By the 18th century Cagots made up considerable portions of various settlements, such as in Baigorri where Cagots made up 10% of the population.

In 1709, the influential politician  planned and constructed the manufacturing town of Nuevo Baztán (after his native Baztan Valley in Navarre) near Madrid. He brought many Cagot settlers to Nuevo Baztán, but after some years, many returned to Navarre, unhappy with their work conditions.

In 1723 the  instituted a fine of 500 French livres for anyone insulting any individual as "alleged descendants of the Giezy race, and treating them as agots, cagots, gahets or ladres"; ordering that they will be admitted to general and particular assemblies, to municipal offices and honors of the church, they may even be placed in the galleries and other places of the said church where they will be treated and recognized as the other inhabitants of the places, without any distinction; as also that their children will be received in the schools and colleges of the cities, towns and villages, and will be admitted in all the Christian instructions indiscriminately.

During the French Revolution substantive steps were taken to end discrimination toward Cagots. Revolutionary authorities claimed that Cagots were no different from other citizens, and de jure discrimination generally came to an end. And while their treatment did improve compared to previous centuries, local prejudice from the non-Cagot populace persisted, though the practice began to decline. Also during the revolution, Cagots stormed record offices and burned birth certificates in an attempt to conceal their heritage. These measures did not prove effective, as the local populace still remembered. Rhyming songs kept the names of Cagot families known.

Modern status 

Kurt Tucholsky wrote in his book on the Pyrenees in 1927: "There were many in the Argelès valley, near Luchon and in the Ariège district. Today they are almost extinct, you have to search hard if you want to see them". Examples of prejudice still occurred into the 19th and 20th century, including a scandal in the village of Lescun where in the 1950s a non-Cagot woman married a Cagot man.

There was a distinct Cagot community in Navarre until the early 20th century, with the small northern village called Arizkun in Basque (or Arizcun in Spanish) being the last haven of this segregation, where the community was contained within the neighbourhood of Bozate. Between 1915 and 1920 the Ursúa noble family sold the land that Cagots had worked for the Ursúa for centuries in the area of Baztan to the Cagot families. Family names in Spain still associated with having Cagot ancestors include: Bidegain, Errotaberea, Zaldua, Maistruarena, Amorena, and Santxotena.

The Cagots no longer form a separate social class and were largely assimilated into the general population. Very little of Cagot culture still exists, as most descendants of Cagots have preferred not to be known as such.

Cagot symbols used in anti-vaccination protests  
In 2021 and 2022 anti-vaccination and anti-vaccine passport protestors in France started wearing the red goose's foot symbol that Cagots were forced to wear, and handed out cards explaining the discrimination against the Cagots.

In media 
 Legend states that in the battle of 1373 that led to The Tribute of the Three Cows, the people of the French  were led by a cagot with four ears.
 In the 1793 French play , by Sylvain Maréchal, the liberated subjects of the kings of Europe provide critiques of and insult their former rulers, where they say the Spanish king has "stupidity, cagotism and despotism [...] imprinted on his royal face". 
 The author Thomas Colley Grattan's 1823 story The Cagot's Hut details the otherness he perceived in the Cagots during his travels in the French Pyrenees, detailing many of the mythical features that became folklore about the Cagots appearance.
 The German poet Heinrich Heine visited the town of Cauterets in July 1841 and learned of the Cagots minority and their discrimination by others, subsequently becoming the topic of his poem Canto XV in Atta Troll.
 References to Cagots have appeared in multiple poems by the 19th century French poet Édouard Pailleron.
 A character called Beñat Le Cagot appears in the novel Shibumi published in 1979 by Trevanian, a pseudonym of Rodney William Whitaker.

Gallery

Fonts

Doors

See also 

 , untouchable caste in Korea.
 , outcast community of Vietnam after the Fall of Saigon.
 , a discriminated group in Japan.
 , a derogatory term used to describe coopers and ropemakers.
 , an ethnic group in the Spanish Basque country and the French Basque coast sometimes linked to the Cagots.
 Cleanliness of blood, ethnic discrimination in the Spanish Old Regime.
 Dalit, (also known as untouchables) in India.
 , an ethnic minority in Spain and Portugal.
 , an ethnic group in Spain who were also discriminated against and have unknown origins.
 Melungeons, of America's central Appalachia.
 Osu in the Igbo society of west Africa
 Untouchability, the practice of ostracising a group of people regarded as 'untouchables'.
 , a discriminated group of cowherders in Northern Spain.
  a persecuted ethnic minority in Mallorca, often referenced in works discussing the persecution of Cagots in Spain.

References

Bibliography

Further reading

External links 
 Cagot Museum in Arreau with illustrations

Basque history
Kingdom of France
Social history of France
Discrimination in France
Discrimination in Spain